Negativity may refer to:
 Negativity (quantum mechanics), a measure of quantum entanglement in quantum mechanics
 Negative charge of electricity
 Electronegativity, a chemical property pertaining to the ability to attract electrons
 Positivity/negativity ratio, in behavioral feedback. 
 Negativity effect, a psychological bias
 Negativity (album)

See also 
 Negative (disambiguation)
 Negativism (disambiguation)